Thomas Allen McBride (November 15, 1847 – September 9, 1930) was an American attorney and judge in Oregon. He was the 20th Chief Justice on the Oregon Supreme Court serving three times as chief between 1913 and 1927. Overall he served on Oregon’s highest court from 1909 till his death in 1930.

Early life
McBride was born on November 15, 1847 in Yamhill County, Oregon near Lafayette, Oregon. He was one of fourteen children Doctor James McBride and his wife Mahala Miller had together. One of Thomas’ younger brothers George W. McBride served as a United States senator, while an older brother John R. McBride served in the house and as Idaho’s territorial chief justice. Thomas attended school in Vancouver, Washington where he also read law, and then spent some time at what is now Linfield College. He was then admitted to the bar on October 6, 1870.

Thomas then practiced law in Lafayette, Oregon City, and then St. Helens from 1872 to 1877. In 1876, he was elected to the Oregon House of Representatives as a Republican from Columbia County. In 1877, he moved to Salt Lake City, Utah, where he lived until 1880. He then returned to Oregon and practiced at Oregon City before becoming the district attorney (DA) for Clatsop County. He served as the DA until 1892.

Judicial career
In 1892, McBride became Clatsop County Circuit Court judge, serving until 1909. While serving on the court he sentenced two people to death by hanging, including the first legal hanging in Clatsop County, Oregon, on December 1, 1893.

On May 1, 1909, Oregon Governor Frank W. Benson appointed McBride to the state supreme court to fill the vacancy created when justice Robert S. Bean resigned. McBride then won a full six year-term in the 1914 election. He was re-elected in 1920 and again in 1926. During his time on the bench he was chief justice of the court from 1913 to 1915, 1917 to 1921, and then from 1923 to 1927. Justice Thomas McBride died in office on September 9, 1930.

Family
McBride first married on February 7, 1874, to Mary E. Merrill of Columbia County, Oregon. They had two children together. Then in 1927 he married Lottie May Chappell.

References

1847 births
1930 deaths
Linfield University alumni
Oregon state court judges
Republican Party members of the Oregon House of Representatives
Chief Justices of the Oregon Supreme Court
People from Lafayette, Oregon
People from St. Helens, Oregon
District attorneys in Oregon
Politicians from Vancouver, Washington
U.S. state supreme court judges admitted to the practice of law by reading law
Justices of the Oregon Supreme Court